Guest room or variants may refer to:

Bedroom
Hotel room
Guestroom (album), a 2002 album by Ivy
The Guest Room, a 2016 novel by Chris Bohjalian
The Guest Room (film), a 2021 film by Stefano Lodovichi
Guest Room, a 2015 short film with Lauren Potter
Guest Room, a 2003 short film with Katie Boland
"Guest Room", a song by The National from Boxer